Ron Berkowitz is an American entrepreneur, publicist and former sports journalist. He is the CEO and founder of the New York City-based Berk Communications.

Early life
Berkowitz was born on February 13, 1972, in New York City to parents Jack and Fran Berkowitz. He went to high school at West Windsor-Plainsboro High School South. 

Berkowitz attended the University of Miami, where he earned a Bachelor of Science in broadcast journalism and political science with a minor in sports management.

Career
While attending the University of Miami, Berkowitz worked for the university radio station WVUM doing play-by-play broadcasting for Miami Hurricanes baseball, football, and basketball teams. He broadcast the Sugar Bowl and the 1992 Orange Bowl.

After graduating, he began working as a reporter for WTOP in Washington D.C, where he covered the Baltimore Orioles, Washington Wizards, and University of Maryland’s Maryland Terrapins. Eventually, Berkowitz took a public relations job with the New York Yankees, before becoming manager of publicity for FOX Television Cable Networks and FX in 1997. In 1999, he left the station and started Berk Communications.

Since founding the company, Berkowitz has represented Michael Rubin, Yoenis Céspedes,  Robinson Cano, Kevin Durant, Dez Bryant and Meek Mill, and some of Jay Z's business ventures. Other notable longstanding clients include: Victor Cruz, Justise Winslow, Miguel Cotto, Andre Ward, CC Sabathia, Geno Smith, Jérôme Boateng, Todd Gurley, Elton Brand, Armand de Brignac, ROC Nation, Roc Nation Sports, NFL, Disney Channel, D'usse, Robert Kraft, PUMA, Body Armor, Van Jones, Reform Alliance, and Tao.

In 2012, along with DJ Williams, Jon Beason, and Jonathan Vilma, he opened the restaurant Brother Jimmy’s BBQ in Miami, Florida. In June 2013, he began representing Alex Rodriguez.

Berk Communications was acquired as an independent subsidiary by the MWWPR firm in October 2015, with Berkowitz continuing to serve as President and CEO of the company. In 2016, he received national media attention and recognition for his role in the makeover of New York Yankee, Alex Rodriguez following a suspension for use of performance-enhancing drugs. In July 2018, Berkowitz was a guest co-host on the CBS Sports Radio program Tiki and Tierney with Tiki Barber.

In April 2021, Berkowitz collaborated with CC Sabathia and the MLB Network to produce a non-traditional game telecast for the New York Yankees versus the Cleveland Indians.

References

Living people
University of Miami alumni
1972 births